Gareth Maclure (born 17 December 1979 in Bury, England) is a former professional rugby union footballer. His regular playing position was on the wing. He previously played for Glasgow Warriors and Newcastle Falcons.

Maclure played at amateur level with  Chester-le-Street and West Hartlepool before signing with Newcastle Falcons. Whilst at Newcastle he was a replacement in the final of the 2001 Anglo-Welsh Cup which Newcastle won.

From there, Maclure moved to Glasgow Warriors. He played for amateur side GHA when not needed by the Warriors.

Maclure left the Warriors in 2005.

Reference list

External links
ESPN Profile

1979 births
Rugby union wings
Living people
Glasgow Warriors players
Glasgow Hutchesons Aloysians RFC players
West Hartlepool R.F.C. players
Newcastle Falcons players